The yellow-vented bulbul (Pycnonotus goiavier), or eastern yellow-vented bulbul, is a member of the bulbul family of passerine birds. It is a resident breeder in southeastern Asia from Indochina to the Philippines. It is found in a wide variety of open habitats but not the deep forest. It is one of the most common birds in cultivated areas. They appear to be nomadic and roam from place to place regularly.

Taxonomy and systematics
The yellow-vented bulbul was originally classified in the genus Muscicapa.

Subspecies
Six subspecies are recognized:
 P. g. jambu - Deignan, 1955: Found from southern Myanmar to southern Indochina
 P. g. analis - (Horsfield, 1821): Originally described as a separate species in the genus Turdus. Found on Malay Peninsula, Sumatra and nearby islands, Java, Bali, Lombok and Sumbawa
 P. g. gourdini - Gray, GR, 1847: Originally described as a separate species in the genus Ixos. Found on Borneo, Maratua and Karimunjava Islands
 P. g. goiavier - (Scopoli, 1786): Found in northern and north-central Philippines
 P. g. samarensis - Rand & Rabor, 1960: Found in central Philippines
 P. g. suluensis - Mearns, 1909: Found in southern Philippines

Behaviour and ecology
The yellow-vented bulbul builds a well-camouflaged but fragile, loose, deep, cup-shaped circular nest from grass, leaves, roots, vine stems, and twigs. The nest is untidy on the outside, but neatly lined with plant fibers. It may be built in a wide range of places from low bushes to high trees. This is a species adapted to humans and may even nest in gardens. The yellow-vented bulbul lays 2–5 eggs from February to June.

The yellow-vented bulbul eats berries and small fruits. They also sip nectar, nibble on young shoots, and consume some insects.

References

External links

 Various images of the yellow-vented bulbul
 "Domesticating" Pycnonotus goiavier by Isidro A. T. Savillo

yellow-vented bulbul
Birds of Southeast Asia
yellow-vented bulbul